is a Japanese football player.

Playing career
Kotani was born in Osaka Prefecture on April 25, 1993. After graduating from Meiji University, he joined the J3 League club Grulla Morioka in 2018. He switched to Blaublitz Akita, only to come back to Iwate Prefecture in 2020.

Club statistics
Updated to 2 January 2020.

References

External links

1993 births
Living people
Meiji University alumni
Association football people from Osaka Prefecture
Japanese footballers
J3 League players
Iwate Grulla Morioka players
Blaublitz Akita players
Association football midfielders